Łazy Małe may refer to the following places in Poland:
Łazy Małe, Lower Silesian Voivodeship (south-west Poland)
Łazy Małe, Podlaskie Voivodeship (north-east Poland)